Athanasoulas or Athanassoulas is a Greek family name. It is a patronymic derived from the Greek male given name Athanasios (Αθανάσιος: "immortal"), the genitive case form Athanasoula (Αθανασούλα) being used by female name bearers.
Notable people with this name include:

 Ioannis Athanasoulas (born 1987), Greek basketball player
 Lia Athanassoula, (born 1948), Greek astronomer
 Lambros Athanassoulas (born 1976), Greek rally driver
 Georgios Athanasoulas, (born 2001), Greek

References 

Greek-language surnames
Surnames